is a Japanese light novel series by Takaya Kagami, with illustrations by Saori Toyota, which was published by Fujimi Shobo in Dragon Magazine from February 20, 2002 to October 20, 2006, and has 11 volumes. Its sequel,  began publishing on October 20, 2007, and has been collected into 18 volumes.

The series has also spun off into other media including a Drama CD, a manga adaptation which is collected into 9 bound volumes and a PSP video game which was released on February 18, 2010. A 24-episode anime adaptation was produced by Zexcs which premiered on July 1, 2010 and is licensed by Kadokawa in Japan and Funimation Entertainment in North America.

Story

Ryner Lute is a lazy student of the Roland Empire Royal Magician's Academy. One day, the Roland Empire goes to war against their neighboring country Estabul, and Ryner loses his classmates in the war. After the war, Ryner sets out on a journey to search the relics of a "Legendary Hero" at King Sion Astal's command and finds out that a deadly curse is spreading throughout the continent.

Main characters 

 
 
 The protagonist of the story. Ryner possesses , an ocular ability which allows him to analyze various forms of magic.  Through this, he has learned how to utilize numerous styles of magic through battle, and become a particularly strong mage. This is unusual, as often Alpha Stigma users are killed at a young age after their power causes them to go berserk. However, due to his father implanting a legendary demon lord's essence into him, Ryner has partially negated his berserk tendencies. Later in the story, Ryner is nearly killed in battle, but awakens as "The Solver of All Formulas (すべての式を解く者, Subete no Shiki o Tokumono)" which grants him incredible omniperceptive abilities.

 
 
 A blonde-hair bishōjo with blue eyes who comes from a famous  designated to serve as guards to the King of Roland. Ferris carries a typically emotionless expression, is extremely proud of her own beauty, and enjoys dango. She is assigned by Sion to accompany Ryner on his quest to search for the "Relics of Heroes". 

 
 
 Son of the previous king and a lowly commoner, Sion is the current king of the nation of Roland. Because of his lowly birth, he was shunned and hated by his half brothers. He vowed at a young age to become king so he can fix this corrupted world. Sion is widely known as a tactical genius, and is willing to sacrifice for the greater good, something about which he is greatly conflicted. He is initially a friend to Ryner, but later opposes him.

 
 
 A cold, calm and reserved man, Lucile is the Head son of the Eris Swords-Clan, a position which he inherited after killing his own parents in order to save Ferris from being raped by their father. He has absorbed the other half of the legendary demon's essence, thus becoming Lucile Eris, "", granting him godlike powers and invincibility. However, Lucile regards this power as a curse.

He is the ruler of the Gastark Empire and a powerful warrior. He is named after the First Ancestor of Edia family, who was the first owner of the Rule Fragment Glouvil. His father told him the story of making of Glouvil and made Riphal promise to never touch the sword.

Leader of the God's Eyes Group, Enne has the body of a young girl, but is really of unknown age. The bearer of Torch Curse (未来眼, トーチ・カース, Tōchi Kāsu), when her powers became active, her body was cursed to stop growing. Invoking her eyes causes red-colored flying birds to appear over her eyes and allow her to see accurately into the future.

Vois is the Supreme Commander of the Anti-Roland Coalition, and appears to be under the influence of the Goddesses. He possesses four pieces of the “Derunio (Death Displacement Stone) (死の転移 デルニオ?, Derunio) Rule Fragment, which can be used to heal even the gravest of injuries.

Pia is the Queen of the Azure Princess Mercenary Group, which is employed to crush small countries in Central Menoris. Currently, she is allied with the Anti-Roland Coalition with a common goal of defeating the Mad Hero. Sees herself as an older sister to Ryner and the rest.

Minor characters

Media

Light novels

The Legend of the Legendary Heroes

The Legend of the Great Legendary Heroes

The Legend of the Legendary Heroes Anyway

The Legend of the Black Fallen Hero

Manga

Web radio
The web radio show, The Legendary Radio of the Legendary Heroes, was hosted on Onsen Internet Radio Station and Animate TV, and starred Jun Fukuyama, Ayahi Takagaki, and Daisuke Ono acting as their fictional counterpart Ryner Lute, Ferris Eris, and Sion Astal respectively. The first episode aired on May 21, 2010 and last one on December 24, 2010, spanning 32 episodes and sub-divided into 8 chapters. Each chapter is accompanied by a theme and usually, with one or more special guests who are usually either another voice actor from the cast, the anime director or the author of the original series, Kagami Takaya. Summary of each radio show episode can be found on Presepe.

Video game
Legendary Saga, a PSP game that is faithfully based on the first 3 novels was released on February 18, 2010 in Japan.

Anime

In January 2010, it was announced an anime adaption of the series. The series was adapted into a 24-episode run by studio Zexcs, directed by Itsuro Kawasaki, with the music composed by Miyu Nakamura, and animation character designs by Noriko Shimazawa. The anime started broadcast on TV Tokyo on July 1, 2010, followed by TV Osaka, TV Aichi and AT-X. The first Blu-ray and DVD of the anime was released on October 22, 2010.

For episodes 1 to 12, the opening and ending theme singles are  performed by Aira Yuhki, produced by Lantis and released on July 21, 2010 with catalog number LACM-4732, and "Truth Of My Destiny" performed by Ceui, produced by Lantis and released on August 11, 2010 with catalog number LACM-4734, respectively. "Lament: Joy Soon" peak ranked 64th on Oricon singles charts, and was an Oricon "Pick" on their 2010 Anime Theme Songs/Summer editorial. "Truth Of My Destiny" peak ranked 75th on Oricon singles charts.

In English, the series is licensed by Funimation in North America and had a simulcast release.
Funimation has also dubbed this series and it can be found on many media; such as Netflix and Hulu (Though both of these services no longer have it).

Reception

As of January 28, 2011, the light novels have sold over 4,300,000 copies.

References

External links
The Legend of the Legendary Heroes at Fujimi Shobo 
Official PSP adaptation Legendary Saga website 
Official Anime website 
The Legend of the Legendary Heroes at TV Tokyo 

Book series introduced in 2002
2002 Japanese novels
2007 Japanese novels
Anime and manga based on light novels
Fujimi Fantasia Bunko
Fujimi Shobo manga
Kadokawa Dwango franchises
Funimation
Gangan Comics manga
Gangan Online manga
Japanese fantasy novels
Light novels
Shōnen manga
Square Enix franchises
TV Tokyo original programming
Zexcs